The 1957 All-SEC football team consists of American football players selected to the All-Southeastern Conference (SEC) chosen by various selectors for the 1957 NCAA University Division football season. Auburn won the conference.

All-SEC selections

Ends
Jimmy Phillips, Auburn (AP-1, UP-1)
Jerry Wilson, Auburn (AP-1, UP-1)
Bob Laws, Vanderbilt (AP-2, UP-3)
Jerry Nabers, Georgia Tech (AP-2, UP-2)
Dan Pelham, Florida (UP-2)
Don Fleming, Florida (AP-3)
Jack Benge, Miss. St.(AP-3)
Don Williams, Ole Miss (UP-3)

Tackles
Lou Michaels, Kentucky (College Football Hall of Fame)  (AP-1, UP-1)
Gene Hickerson, Ole Miss (AP-1, UP-1)
Charlie Mitchell, Florida (AP-2, UP-2)
Ben Preston, Auburn (AP-2, UP-2)
Ned Dye, Georgia (AP-2)
Sam Latham, Miss. St. (AP-2)
Al Aucoin, LSU (UP-3)
Jim Smelcher, Tennessee (UP-3)

Guards
Bill Johnson, Tennessee (AP-1, UP-1)
Jackie Simpson, Ole Miss (AP-1, UP-2)
George Deiderich, Vanderbilt (AP-2, UP-1)
Billy Rains, Alabama (AP-2, UP-2)
Zeke Smith, Auburn (AP-3, UP-3)
Cicero Lucas, Georgia (AP-3)
Tim Baker, Auburn (UP-3)

Centers
Don Stephenson, Georgia Tech (AP-1, UP-1)
Jackie Burkett, Auburn (AP-2, UP-2)
Jack Benson, Miss. St. (AP-3, UP-2 [as G])
Jimmy Dodd, Miss. St. (UP-3)

Backs 
Billy Stacy, Miss. St. (AP-1, UP-1)
Bobby Gordon, Tennessee (AP-1, UP-1)
Jimmy Taylor, LSU (AP-1, UP-1)
Jimmy Rountree, Florida (AP-1, UP-2)
Ray Brown, Ole Miss (AP-2, UP-1)
Phil King, Vanderbilt (AP-2, UP-2)
Bill Atkins, Auburn (AP-2, UP-2)
Bobby Crevens, Kentucky (AP-2, UP-3)
Billy Cannon, LSU (College Football Hall of Fame)  (UP-2)
Royce Smith, Vanderbilt (AP-3, UP-3)
Tommy Lorton, Auburn  (AP-3, UP-3)
Billy Lott, Ole Miss (AP-3)
Theron Sapp, Georgia (AP-3)
Tommy Bronson, Tennessee (UP-3)

Key
AP = Associated Press.

UP = United Press
Bold = Consensus first-team selection by both AP and UP

See also
1957 College Football All-America Team

References

All-SEC
All-SEC football teams